James Rice may refer to:

 James Rice (cricketer), English amateur cricketer, 1811–13
 James Rice (writer) (1843–1882), English novelist
 James A. Rice (born 1957), American attorney, judge, and politician
 James Clay Rice (1829–1864), American Civil War Union general
 James Mahmud Rice (born 1972), Australian sociologist
 James Montgomery Rice (1842–1912), American lawyer and politician
 James O. Rice, commanding officer of the Texas Rangers at the Battle of the San Gabriels
 James R. Rice (born 1940), American scholar in the field of solid mechanics
 James S. Rice (1846–1939), American businessman and rancher
 L. James Rice, author of the fantasy novel series Sundering the Gods Saga
 Jim Rice (born 1953), American baseball player
 Jim Rice, contestant on Survivor: South Pacific (2011)
 Jim Rice (Idaho politician), American politician, Idaho state senator
 Jim Rice (Minnesota politician) (1925–1996), American politician, Minnesota state representative
 Jim Rice (motorcyclist), racing motorcycle rider

See also
Jimmy Rice (disambiguation)